Windom Park is a neighborhood in the Northeast community in Minneapolis. Its boundaries are Lowry Avenue NE to the north, New Brighton Boulevard to the east, 18th Avenue NE to the south, and Central Avenue to the west.

The neighborhood's housing stock is split evenly between owned properties and rental properties.  In 2006, the average home sale price in Windom Park was $240,500.  In the west part of the neighborhood, houses were mostly built between 1895 and 1910.  On the east side, most houses were built after World War II.

The rental property is primarily concentrated in a complex of apartments between Ulysses and Arthur Street south of 19th Avenue.  Additional rental property is scattered throughout the neighborhood.  Greater amounts of rental property exist west of Johnson than on the east side of the neighborhood.

References

External links
Minneapolis Neighborhood Profile - Windom Park
Windom Park Citizens in Action

Neighborhoods in Minneapolis